= Bilkhiriya Khurd =

- village
- Location within Madhya Pradesh Location within India
- Coordinates: 23.135102°N 77.453090°E
- Country: India
- State: Madhya Pradesh
- District: Bhopal
- Tehsil: Huzur

Population (2011)
  - Total: 106
- Time zone: UTC+5:30 (IST)
- ISO 3166 code: MP-IN
- Census code: 482547

Bilkhiriya Khurd is a village in the Bhopal district of Madhya Pradesh, India. It is located in the Huzur tehsil and the Phanda block.

== Demographics ==
According to the 2011 census of India, Bilkhiriya Khurd has 23 households. The effective literacy rate (i.e. the literacy rate of population excluding children aged 6 and below) is 79.57%.

Demographics (2011 Census)
	Total	Male	Female
Population	106	63	43
Children aged below 6 years	13	7	6
Scheduled caste	106	63	43
Scheduled tribe	0	0	0
Literates	74	53	21
Workers (all)	31	28	3
Main workers (total)	31	28	3
Main workers: Cultivators	8	8	0
Main workers: Agricultural labourers	7	5	2
Main workers: Household industry workers	1	1	0
Main workers: Other	15	14	1
Marginal workers (total)	0	0	0
Marginal workers: Cultivators	0	0	0
Marginal workers: Agricultural labourers	0	0	0
Marginal workers: Household industry workers	0	0	0
Marginal workers: Others	0	0	0
Non-workers	75	35	40
